Amanda Morgan (also ap Morgan for generations after the First Amanda -- "ap" is a Welsh Patronymic similar to "Mac" in Gaelic) is the name of several fictional characters appearing in Gordon R. Dickson's  Childe Cycle series of novels and stories. This includes the protagonist of the novella "Amanda Morgan" in The Spirit of Dorsai and The Dorsai Companion.

Within the Childe Cycle there are several characters that have a triple nature which manifests itself in different ways (see: Welsh Triads)  Amanda Morgan is one of them, and as a unique character she is a single character written as three entirely separate people.  The three characters are referred to as  The First Amanda, The Second Amanda, and The Third Amanda.  The Third Amanda is also sometimes referred to as Hal's Amanda.  "Amanda" as a name is appropriate, as its definition is "One fit to be loved."

Unlike the Donal Graeme - Paul Formain - Hal Mayne trinity  (all of whom are actually one person),  the three Amanda Morgans do not comprise one entity  or can be considered reincarnations.  Each of the characters has a subtly different personality and motivation, while sharing a common name, appearance, and family.  In addition, each of their personal stories can be considered important to the overall narrative while at the same time being background or color.  Only the Third Amanda is a main character in the Childe Cycle proper.

Each of the Three Amandas can also be looked at as an evolution of the previous character. This evolution can be equated with that of The Dorsai culture. The first Amanda's responsibility is directly related to her family and immediate community. The Second Amanda's responsibility is for The Dorsai as a whole.  The Third Amanda's responsibility transcends the other two and encompasses the whole of humanity. Paralleling this, The Dorsai as a people began as simple mercenary soldiers interested in making a living. By the Second Amanda, they have developed a moral code and reputation as a society that protects them as a whole. Finally, as embodied by the Third Amanda, The Dorsai become the protectors of all humanity and its potential.  

All three Amandas are at some time in their lives members of the Grey Captains.  (The First Amanda belonged to a proto-group that does not share this name, but is clearly the predecessor of the Grey Captains.) This informal group of important individuals are what amounts to government on The Dorsai.  The fact that the Third Amanda and to a certain extent the Second Amanda are significantly younger than most of the Grey Captains is some insight into the importance of the Morgan family on The Dorsai as a whole.  As a final evolution of the character The Third Amanda becomes what amounts to the single leader of a very individualistic culture.  Something that Donal Graeme never wanted or managed to do.

The Amanda's

The First Amanda

This poem begins "Amanda Morgan", one of a series of stories referred to as "illuminations" that are not part of the Childe Cycle proper.  It was written specifically for The First Amanda by her son James.  All of her descendants were musically talented. 
 
Stone are my walls, and my roof is of timber;
But the hands of my builder are stronger by far.
The roof may be burned and my stones may be scattered
Never her light be defeated in war...
 (Song of the house called "Fal Morgan")

The First Amanda was born in Caernarfon, Wales on Earth, around the same time as the novel Necromancer.  Apparently married young, she had one child while on Earth before her husband died.   After his death, her in-laws used legal means and influence to remove the child from her custody. The First Amanda here shows the signs of her indomitable character by physically stealing the child back from them, and then emigrating immediately from the Earth to the new colony of Newton. Unfortunately the process caused much psychological damage to the child,  who was thereafter prone to uncontrollable fits of rage.  Much of the rest of The First Amanda's life is devoted to caring for this child and founding the Morgan Family, though a second husband on Newton and her final husband on The Dorsai. In spite of these two husbands, the ap Morgan family is descended entirely from The First Amanda through her first child, James.

Later in her life, The First Amanda played the role of matriarch for both her family and the community as a whole. This role culminated in her key position in the defence of The Dorsal against the Dow deCastries and the combined Earth expeditionary forces at the age of 93. This accomplishment could be considered secondary to her influence on the culture and morals of The Dorsai as a whole, were it not that this single incident was instrumental in the evolution of that people. These events are chronicled in the novella, "Amanda Morgan", and the novel, Tactics of Mistake.

The Second Amanda

Born a generation after the death of the First Amanda, The Second Amanda was named Elaine (legend) (See also: Elaine of Astolat.) Due to the importance and strong character of the First Amanda, none of her decedents dared to name a girl child after her. However, by the time The Second Amanda was six years old people were already referring to her as "The Second Amanda" due to her uncanny resemblance to her ancestor. That name stuck, and Elaine was thereafter only a footnote in family histories.

The Second Amanda is known chiefly as an expert in contracts and legality for The Dorsai.  While this makes her important to The Dorsai of her time, her real influence is in her relationship with the Graeme family.  The Second Amanda is the one that both of the twins, Ian and Kensie Graeme were in love with, yet she was in love with only one. This unlikely love triangle led by stages to several important consequences. Ian, knowing his brother was passionately interested in Amanda, refused to pursue her and married another woman. The Second Amanda, however, was not interested in Kensie at all. Her interest was entirely for Ian, who was then unavailable.

This untenable position caused all three individuals to be unhappy, and in the end led indirectly to the death of Kensie. This would not normally be an event of note, except that it released Ian to be of use to his nephew Donal Graeme in uniting the known worlds. The Second Amanda never married, but much later in her life managed a relationship with Ian Graeme after his first wife had died.  As heads of their respective families they maintained continuity of tradition and responsibility amongst The Dorsai. These events are chronicled in the stories Lost Dorsai, Brothers, and Soldier, Ask Not.  Further background is  provided in The Final Encyclopedia and the interludes of The Spirit of Dorsai.

The Third Amanda
The Second Amanda, knowing the family's tradition against naming girl children Amanda, made sure that when a suitable girl was born the name was passed on.  The Third Amanda grew up under the tutelage of her namesake, and grew in her own time to be an expert in contracts and also a head of her family.   Perhaps the most important moment in her life is when she meets Hal Mayne.  This leads her  eventually  to be one of his chief advisors, part of The Dorsai forces defending Earth, and eventually his lover and de facto wife.    

The Third Amanda's support for Hal Mayne is part of another trilogy of characters that combine the three parts of humanity as Gordon R. Dickson envisions.   She is the strength, the courage, and the competence that complements the other two muses in his life.  Rukh Tamani, who embodies Faith, and Ajela who embodies Understanding being these other two components based on the Childe Cycle splinter cultures.  The interesting thing is that each of these three characters embodies all three of the important philosophies: Courage, Faith, Understanding.   The only difference is their emphasis of one over the other two.  The Third Amanda certainly possesses both Faith and Understanding, but it is her Courage and Personal Responsibility that are paramount to her character.

As part of this collection of three interconnected characters the Third Amanda represents The Dorsai, which in many ways each of the Amandas represents for their era.  All of the novels are filled with  these triple representations of the three splinter cultures in different forms.  The Amanda character is probably the most well defined and rounded of these, with the possible exception of the  Donal Graeme - Paul Formain - Hal Mayne trinity.  She is also one of a select few characters to appear in several stories, and like Ian Graeme to have an illumination story directly focused on her.  In this she has become one of the classic characters in science fiction.

External links

 (collection containing "Amanda Morgan" and "Brothers")
 (collection containing "Lost Dorsai" and "Warrior")

Morgan, Amanda
Gordon R. Dickson